Marialbert Barrios (born 1990) is a Venezuelan politician who was elected to the National Assembly in 2015 and was the youngest member. She represented the district of Catia in western Caracas.

References

External links 
https://www.instagram.com/marialbertbs/
https://twitter.com/marialbertbs?lang=en

Living people
Venezuelan politicians
Year of birth uncertain
People from Caracas
1990 births